The David Johnston University Cup is a national collegiate sports award, presented annually to the champion of a season-ending tournament played by U Sports men's ice hockey teams in Canada. The UQTR Patriotes are the current champions for the 2021–2022 season. The Alberta Golden Bears have won the most championships with 16, and have also appeared in another seven finals.

Originally called the CIAU University Cup in 1962, with minor changes through the decades when Canada's national university sports organization changed its own name, the trophy's name was changed on March 13, 2018, to honour David Johnston, a few months after he served as Governor General of Canada.

The 2020 championship tournament was cancelled due to the COVID-19 pandemic after two quarter-final games had already been played. On October 15, 2020, the 2021 national championship was also cancelled. The 2022 University Cup tournament was held March 31–April 3 at Acadia University in Wolfville, Nova Scotia.

History
The trophy was presented to U Sports, then known as the Canadian Intercollegiate Athletic Union (CIAU), for presentation to a national champion starting with the 1962–63 season, by Queen's University and the Royal Military College of Canada.  These two schools, located in Kingston, Ontario, had been the participants in the first organized interuniversity hockey game, played in Kingston in 1885. The cup is meant to recognize the overall contribution made to the game of hockey by outstanding university players.

The CIAU changed its name to Canadian Interuniversity Sport (renaming the trophy the CIS University Cup) in 2001, and in October 2016 to U Sports (renaming the trophy the U Sports University Cup).

On March 13, 2018, U Sports renamed the cup the David Johnston University Cup in honour of David Johnston, former Governor General of Canada.

The original University Cup is located at the Hockey Hall of Fame in Toronto and does not travel publicly. A replica was created with a less ornate cup in 2006. Between 2006 and 2015, the trophy has been modified after several repairs - the metal bowl is now of simpler design, and mounts more flush to the main wooden portion. The two handles that used to be attached to the bowl, and frequently broke off, were removed. An additional black wooden ring was added to the bottom of the trophy in order to incorporate more school shields, as an engraved metal shield, with diagonal stripes in the winning school's colours, is added to the trophy every year.

With the completion of the 2018–19 championship, 27 different teams have played in the national championship final (however Sir George Williams University merged with Loyola College in 1974 to create Concordia University, so it could be described as 26 different teams). In all, 17 different teams have won the national championship.

The Alberta Golden Bears hold the record of 16 championship wins, as well as the record of 22 championship final appearances. The Toronto Varsity Blues hold the record of 5 consecutive championship trophy wins, from 1969 through 1973, but have not returned to the tournament since 1993, when they suffered the second most lopsided loss in a UCup final, 12–1; during their power years, winning 9 UCups in the 1960s and 1970s, the Blues were the victors in the overall most lopsided final, winning 16–2 in 1967. In the seven years from 2013 through 2019, only the Alberta Golden Bears (3 wins) or the UNB Reds (4 wins) won the championship.

The winningest coach is Tom Watt, who at the helm as the Toronto Varsity Blues won nine University Cup championships between 1966 and 1977. Second is current UNB Reds coach Gardiner MacDougall with seven UCup wins between 2007 and 2019, while Clare Drake is third, coaching the Alberta Golden Bears to six University Cup championships between 1964 and 1986.

Tournament Formats

Pre 1998
A varying number of tournament formats had been used prior to 1998. Towards the end of this era, the common format was a 4-team single elimination event between the four conference champions: AUS (called the AUAA at the time - Atlantic University Athletic Association), CW (called the CWUAA at the time - Canada West Universities Athletic Association) and OUA East & West (called the OUAA at the time -  Ontario Universities Athletics Association), with the Top 10 ranking determining the opponents in the semi-finals (1v4 and 2v3). In most cases, the semi-finals were on Saturday with the championship game on Sunday. Games were hosted at Varsity Arena in Toronto. In some events, the finals were at Maple Leaf Gardens

1998 to 2014
Starting in 1998, the CIS changed the format of the University Cup tournament to a six-team/two-pool tournament that would be hosted by a CIS member institution/team rather than in Toronto at Varsity Arena. The host would automatically be included in the tournament leaving five spots for regional representatives. The three conference champions and OUA Queen's Cup Runner-up would automatically be included with the fifth spot as a rotating 'wild-card' team. The University of Saskatchewan Huskies won the bid to host the first three(3) tournaments; 1998, 1999 and 2000.

The wild-card selection was initially chosen based on a static rotation through each conference starting with the AUS in 1998 followed by the OUA and CW, repeating on a tri-year cycle. Due to the random nature of the host bidding process, some tournaments saw more local teams then expected when the host advanced as a conference champion. It was possible for CW or AUS hosts to have 3 teams from their conference or 4 teams in the case of an OUA host who was also a champion. To reduce the local bias, the rotation selection rule was changed prior to the 2009 season - the wild-card would now only come from a non-host conference while maintaining the rotation. In 2009 the OUA  was the host conference (Lakehead University) and should have also been the original wild-card conference, instead the AUS provided the wild-card. This rule remained in effect until the format changed in 2015 to 8-teams.

2015 to present day
Starting in 2015, the U Sports Hockey championship tournament expanded from six to eight teams and moved from a two-pool format to a single-elimination competition (quarter-finals, semifinals and final with a bronze-medal game).

The eight teams competing include the four regional conference champions: AUS, Canada West, OUA West & OUA East (where the three hockey teams from the RSEQ compete). The remaining four teams are: the host, the Canada West runner-up, the AUS runner-up and the OUA 3rd-place finisher (bronze medalist). The 'natural' conference champions would be seeded 1–3; AUS, CW and OUA Queen's Cup Champion. The OUA Queen's Cup Finalist is always seed #4. The remaining teams would be seeded 5–8, all based on the pre-tournament Top 10 Ranking Poll.

A joint bid from St. Francis Xavier University and Saint Mary's University was selected to host the first two events using this format; 2015 (St. FX as the host) and 2016 (SMU as the host). U Sports evaluated these two events and continues to promote this tournament format.

Champions

University Cup Final appearances
These tables rank appearances in the final championship game.

By team

By team's province

The only province missing from this list, Newfoundland and Labrador, has only one U Sports member, Memorial University of Newfoundland. Memorial dropped their varsity men's hockey team after the 1981–82 season.

Tournament location

By city

By province

British Columbia is the only province to have a team play in the championship final (UBC Thunderbirds were runners-up in the original 1963 competition, nothing else since then), but to never host the championships. The other province missing from this list, Newfoundland and Labrador, had not yet hosted yet when it withdrew from varsity men's hockey after the 1981–82 season.

Major W.J. "Danny" McLeod Award
In addition to the University Cup, the Major W.J. "Danny" McLeod Award is presented at the end of each year's championship, to the University Cup's Most Valuable Player.

Major McLeod was the overall athletic director at the Royal Military College of Canada (RMC), was the coach of RMC's ice hockey team, and simultaneously coached two Kingston teams in the Ontario Hockey Association – the Kingston Frontenacs (Junior B) and the Kingston Aces (Senior A). McLeod was instrumental in establishing the Canadian Intercollegiate Athletic Union (CIAU) in 1961, operating the CIAU from his office at RMC as the first CIAU Secretary-Treasurer. He helped create the national university ice hockey championship tournament, which was hosted by RMC for its first two years (1963, 1964).

The Major W.J. "Danny" McLeod Award winners:

See also

 NCAA Men's Ice Hockey Championship, the closest equivalent in the United States for men's college ice hockey

References

External links
 University Cup Championships
 HHoF University Cup

U Sports ice hockey trophies and awards
Ice hockey tournaments in Canada
U Sports ice hockey